Jelovjane is a village in the municipality of Bogovinje, North Macedonia.

Demographics
Jelovjane has traditionally been inhabited by a Muslim Macedonian (Torbeš) population stemming from the Gorani community. Villagers of Jelovjane speak the Slavic (Macedonian) Gorani dialect.

As of the 2021 census, Jelovjane had 283 residents with the following ethnic composition:
Turks 173
Persons for whom data are taken from administrative sources 68
Macedonians 9
Albanians 8
Others 25

According to the 2002 census, the village had a total of 599 inhabitants. Ethnic groups in the village include:

Turks 539
Albanians 40
Bosniaks 8
Macedonians 5
Others 7

References

External links

Gorani people
Macedonian Muslim villages
Villages in Bogovinje Municipality